Eligijus Masiulis (born 15 October 1974) is a former Lithuanian politician. He has represented Liberal Movement party from 2008 to 2016. From 2008 to 2012 he was Minister of Transport and Communications of Lithuania.

In May 2016 Liberal Movement leader Masiulis stepped down after €106k bribe allegations from MG Baltic, one of the largest business groups in the Baltic countries. Antanas Guoga,  was made the temporary leader of the Liberal Movement following the potential bribery scandal that prompted Eligijus Masiulis to step down. Masiulis may not have been the only person involved in potentially corrupt activities. After 2 years of investigation, the case charging Masiulis and MG Baltic has reached the court. National Security and Defence Committee of Seimas is currently investigating businesses influence on Lithuanian politics.

References 

Politicians from Klaipėda
1974 births
Living people
Ministers of Transport and Communications of Lithuania
Lithuanian political scientists
Members of the Seimas
21st-century Lithuanian politicians
Klaipėda University alumni
Liberal Union of Lithuania politicians
Liberal and Centre Union politicians
Liberal Movement (Lithuania) politicians